Pindorama Biological Reserve is a biological reserve in the state of São Paulo, Brazil.

Location

The reserve is located in the municipality of Pindorama in the state of São Paulo.

Conservation

The Pindorama Experimental Station of the Instituto Agronômico da Coordenadoria da Pesquisa Agropecuária was transformed into the biological reserve by law no.4.960 of 6 January 1986.
169 species of birds have been identified.

Notes

Sources

Biological reserves of Brazil
Protected areas of São Paulo (state)
Protected areas of the Atlantic Forest